

References

B